Rajendar Nath Rehbar (5 November 1931 - 13 November 2022)  was an Urdu Poet and Bollywood lyricist. He is the writer of the nazm Teri Khushboo Me Base Khat sung by ghazal singer Jagjit Singh. He is a disciple of the Urdu poet Ratan Pandoravi.

Early and personal life
Rajindar Nath Rehbar was born in Shakargarh Punjab (Modern day Pakistan). After initial years of primary schooling in Shakargarh, he studied in Punjab University where he completed his post-graduation from Khalsa College and did LLB from Punjab University.

Literary career
Rajendar Nath Rehbar started writing poetry in his childhood. He has written in several genres of Urdu literature like Ghazal and Nazm.

He has performed at more than 2000 shows and kavi sammelans over the last four decades including in foreign countries.

Books
Rajendar Nath Rehbar has written ten books in different genres of Urdu literature. Some of his books are:
Teri khushboo me base khat
Kalas (1962)
Malhaar (1975)
Aur shaam dhal gayi (1978)
Zeb-e-Sukhan (1997)
Tere Khushboo Mein Base Khat (2003)
Yaad Aaunga (2006)
Urdu Nazm Mein Panjab Ka Hissa (2017)
Tere Khushboo Mein Base Khat (second edition, 2017)

Awards
Shiromani Sahityakaar Award
Dr. C Narayan Reddy Literary Award
Pt. Ratan Pandoravi Award
Life Time Achievement Award
Firaq Gorakhpuri Award
Amrita Preetam Samriti Samman
Dushyant Kumar Rajat Samman

Film/Album

References

External links
Official Fan Page
Official Fan Club
Rajindar Nath Rehbar on Kavitakosh

1931 births
2022 deaths
People from Narowal District
Urdu-language poets
Indian male poets